Remo Stars Football Club is a professional football club based in Ikenne, Ogun State, Nigeria. The club competes the Nigeria Professional Football League. the top division of the Nigeria Football League system. They are nicknamed the Sky Blue Stars.

History
The club was founded in 2004 by Kunle Soname as F.C. Dender.

In 2010, continuous hard work of the club saw them promoted to the second tier of Nigerian Football, the Nigeria National League (NNL). Further development saw the club's management re-brand its organization. The rebranding included a change of name when F.C. Dender relocated to its current base of Remoland and changed its name to "Remo Stars Football Club".
They played in the top division of Nigerian football, the Nigerian Premier League after promotion in 2016.

In 2018, Remo Stars was relegated from the Nigerian Professional Football League (NPFL) to Nigeria National League.

In September 2021, Remo Stars secured promotion to the Nigeria Professional Football League (NPFL) after finishing second in Nigeria National League (NNL) playoff Group A.

Color 
Remo Stars FC are also known as Sky Blue Stars.  The primary color for Remo Stars is Sky Blue, While the away strips is yellow and the alternative color is white.

Kits and Sponsorship

Stadium 
As a developing amateur team, Dender FC now Remo Stars FC played and trained at a local pitch in Ketu, in Lagos State.

The club then relocated  to Remo Land in Ogun State and rebranded with a change of name to Remo Stars FC, as they play their home matches at Dipo Dina Stadium in Ijebu Ode until their promotion into the Nigeria Professional Football League for 2017/2018 season.

Remo Stars then move to Gateway International Stadium in Sagamu for their first season Nigeria professional football league season.

Remo Stars Fc currently play their home matches in Nigeria professional football league at the newly constructed Remo Stars FC Stadium, Ikenne.

Current squad
As of 30 March 2019

Former notable players

References

Football clubs in Nigeria
Sagamu
Sports clubs in Nigeria